Autism spectrum disorder (ASD) refers to a variety of conditions typically identified by challenges with social skills, communication, speech, and repetitive sensory-motor behaviors. The 11th International Classification of Diseases (ICD-11), released in January 2021, characterizes ASD by the associated deficits in the ability to initiate and sustain two-way social communication and restricted or repetitive behavior unusual for the individual's age or situation. Although linked with early childhood, the symptoms can appear later as well. Symptoms can be detected before the age of two and experienced practitioners can give a reliable diagnosis by that age. However, official diagnosis may not occur until much older, even well into adulthood. There is a large degree of variation in how much support a person with ASD needs in day-to-day life. This can be classified by a further diagnosis of ASD level 1, level 2, or level 3. Of these, ASD level 3 describes people requiring very substantial support and who experience more severe symptoms. ASD-related deficits in nonverbal and verbal social skills can result in impediments in personal, family, social, educational, and occupational situations. This disorder tends to have a strong correlation with genetics along with other factors. More research is identifying ways in which epigenetics is linked to autism. Epigenetics generally refers to the ways in which chromatin structure is altered to affect gene expression. Mechanisms such as cytosine regulation and post-translational modifications of histones. Of the 215 genes contributing, to some extent in ASD, 42 have been found to be involved in epigenetic modification of gene expression. Some examples of ASD signs are specific or repeated behaviors, enhanced sensitivity to materials, being upset by changes in routine, appearing to show reduced interest in others, avoiding eye contact and limitations in social situations, as well as verbal communication. When social interaction becomes more important, some whose condition might have been overlooked suffer social and other exclusion and are more likely to have coexisting mental and physical conditions. Long-term problems include difficulties in daily living such as managing schedules, hypersensitivities (e.g., to foods, noises, fabric textures, light), initiating and sustaining relationships, and maintaining jobs.

Diagnosis is based on observation of behavior and development. Many, especially girls and those who have fewer social difficulties, may have been misdiagnosed with other conditions. Males are diagnosed with ASD four to five times more often than females. The reasons for this remain predominantly unclear, but current hypotheses include a higher testosterone level in utero, different presentations of symptoms in females (leading to misdiagnosis or underdiagnosis) compared to males, and gender bias. Clinical assessment of children can involve a variety of individuals, including the caregiver(s), the child, and a core team of professionals (pediatricians, child psychiatrists, speech-and-language therapists and clinical/educational psychologists). For adult diagnosis, clinicians identify neurodevelopmental history, behaviors, difficulties in communication, limited interests and problems in education, employment, and social relationships. Challenging behaviors may be assessed with functional analysis to identify the triggers causing them. The sex and gender disparity in ASD diagnostics requires further research in terms of adding diagnosis specifiers as well as female-oriented examples, which may be masked through camouflaging behaviors. Camouflaging is defined as a coping mechanism used in social situations, consisting of individuals pretending to be other people without any communication difficulties. Because of camouflaging and other societal factors, females with ASD are more likely to be diagnosed late or with a different mental health concern. In general, it is critical for people to understand that the female ASD phenotype is less noticeable, especially when they present as "higher functioning" than others with ASD. Lastly, due to the imbalance in sexes participating in ASD studies, the  literature is potentially biased towards the ways that it presents in male individuals.

ASD is considered a lifelong condition and has no "cure." Many professionals, advocates, and people in the autistic community agree that a cure is not the answer and efforts should instead focus on methods to help people with ASD have happier, healthier, and, if possible, independent lives. Support efforts include teaching social and behavioral skills, monitoring, factoring-in co-existing conditions, and guidance for the caregivers, family, educators, and employers. There is no specific medication for ASD, however, drugs can be prescribed for other co-existing mental health conditions, such as anxiety. A study in 2019 found that the management of challenging behaviors was generally of low quality, with little support for long-term usage of psychotropic drugs, and concerns about their inappropriate prescription. Genetic research has improved the understanding of ASD-related molecular pathways. Animal research has pointed to the reversibility of phenotypes but the studies are at an early stage.

Cortical hyperexcitability and ASD 
One of the leading theories of a potential pathogenic process in ASD is cortical hyperexcitability. Maintaining proper levels of cortical excitability is essential for many important cognitive functions, such as processing sensory information, communication between different regions of the brain, and neural plasticity. Hyperexcitability can disrupt these functions and thereby alter cognitive dynamism in important ways. For example,  cortical hyperexcitability can affect how the duration of sensory stimuli are perceived. A common trait of ASD is reduced somatosensory functioning, which has been linked to alterations in cortical hyperexcitability in ASD individuals. Cortical hyperexcitability can also alter how "old" and "new" stimuli are perceived by changing habituation and adaptation processes in the brain. Altered habituation processes have been linked to characteristic traits of ASD, such as under-responsiveness to some stimuli and over-responsiveness to others.

There are many genetic and epigenetic factors that can contribute to increased excitability, but one of the mechanisms implicated in ASD is alterations in GABAergic systems in the cortex. GABA is the main neurotransmitter implicated in inhibition in the cortex of mammalian brains; changes to this cortical inhibitory system can result in increased excitability. Alterations in this system have been associated not only with ASD but also with several other psychiatric disorders, such as major depressive disorder (MDD) and schizophrenia.

Alterations in the GABAergic system can occur through several epigenetic mechanisms, including modification of chromosome 15q11 to q13 regions which cause reduced levels of GABA signaling. Cortical excitability can also be increased by modifications in the glutamatergic system.

Chromosome 15q11-13 and GABA signaling 
Chromosome 15q11-13 contain genes encoding subunits of GABA receptors, and both deletion and duplication of this region can lead to cortical hyperexcitability. Duplications of 15q11-13 are associated with about 5% of patients with ASD and about 1% of patients diagnosed with classical Autism. 15q11-13 in humans contains a cluster of genetically imprinted genes important for normal neurodevelopment. Like other genetically imprinted genes, the parent of origin determines the phenotypes associated with 15q11-13 duplications. "Parent of origin effects" cause gene expression to occur only from one of the two copies of alleles that individuals receive from their parents. (For example, MKRN3 shows a parent of origin effect and is paternally imprinted. This means that only the MKRN3 allele received from the paternal side will be expressed.) Duplications in the maternal copy lead to a distinct condition that often includes autism.

Genes that are deficient in paternal or maternal 15q11-13 alleles result in Prader-Willi or Angelman syndromes, respectively, both of which are linked to high incidence of ASD. Overexpression of maternally imprinted genes is predicted to cause autism, which focuses attention to the maternally expressed genes on 15q11-13, although it is still possible that alterations in the expression of both imprinted and bilallelically expressed genes contribute to these disorders. The commonly duplicated region of chromosome 15 also includes paternally imprinted genes that can be considered candidates for ASD.

GABAA receptor genes on 15q11-13 
Members of the GABA receptor family, especially GABRB3, are attractive candidate genes for Autism because of their function in the nervous system. GABRB3 null mice exhibit behaviors consistent with autism and multiple genetic studies have found significant evidence for association. Furthermore, a significant decrease in abundance of GABRB3 has been reported in the brains of patients with autism and Rett syndrome. Other GABA receptors residing on different chromosomes have also been associated with autism (e.g. GABRA4 and GABRB1 on chromosome 4p).

Epigenetic regulation of gene expression in 15q11-13 
Regulation of gene expression in the 15q11-13 is rather complex and involves a variety of mechanisms such as DNA methylation, non-coding and anti-sense RNA.

The imprinted genes of 15q11-13 are under the control of a common regulatory sequence, the imprinting control region (ICR). The ICR is a differentially methylated CpG island at the 5' end of SNRPN. It is heavily methylated on the silent maternal allele and unmethylated on the active paternal allele.

MeCP2, which is a candidate gene for Rett syndrome, has been shown to affect regulation of expression in 15q11-13. Altered (decreased) expression of UBE3A and GABRB3 is observed in MeCP2 deficient mice and ASD patients. This effect seems to happen without MeCP2 directly binding to the promoters of UBE3A and GABRB3. (Mechanism unknown) However, chromatin immunoprecipitation and bisulfite sequencing have demonstrated that MeCP2 binds to methylated CpG sites within GABRB3 and the promoter of SNRPN/SNURF.

Furthermore, homologous 15q11-13 pairing in neurons that is disrupted in RTT and autism patients, has been shown to depend on MeCP2. Combined, these data suggest a role for MeCP2 in the regulation of imprinted and biallelic genes in 15q11-13. However, evidently, it does not play a role in the maintenance of imprinting.

Folate-methionine pathway enzymes 
One current theory of the pathophysiology of ASD is that it arises from a deficit in the folate-methionine pathway. Folate donates methyl groups to convert homocysteine into methionine, which is the precursor of S-adenosylmethionine. S-adenosylmethionine is the methyl group donor responsible for DNA and histone methylation. Epigenetic changes can result in changed gene expression of pathway enzymes resulting in a change in folate levels which can contribute to ASD. These changes to the epigenetic regulation interact with the pregnant woman's immune system activation and can result in an ASD phenotype in the fetus' brain. To add, low levels of folate in the pregnant woman are correlated with DNA hypomethylation in the fetus.

The gene MTHFR codes for the enzyme methylenetetrahydrofolate reductase which is necessary for the synthesis of 5-methyl-tetrahydrofolate, a biologically active form of folate One important risk factor that has been identified for ASD is polymorphism in MTHFR. A meta-analysis demonstrated that polymorphism of the MTHFR C677T genotype is correlated with an ASD diagnosis in children from countries lacking food fortification.

While MTHFR is a proposed genetic factor for ASD, there is limited clinical evidence from testing for MTHFR gene polymorphisms in the diagnostic setting. The reason for these complications may be due to other modifiers of the folate metabolism pathway or other genes included in the pathway. Additionally, the levels of homocysteine (HCy) seem to result in an increased utility of the folate metabolism pathway as a predictor for ASD diagnosis.

Valproate exposure as an Histone Deacetylase (HDAC) inhibitor 
If the fetus is exposed to the mood stabilizer drug valproate (VPA), the risk of ASD as well as other developmental abnormalities (decreased intrauterine growth, spina bifida, limb defects, craniofacial defects, etc.) is increased. VPA is an anticonvulsant drug commonly administered for generalized and partial seizures, but also for the treatment of migraines and bipolar mood disorder. Its mechanisms of action are varied, including enhanced GABA neurotransmission, modified inositol metabolism, and interaction with the ERK and Wnt/B-catenin signaling systems. If taken while pregnant, the risk of ASD is 8.9% to 10.8%. When VPA and another antiepileptic drug are taken, the risk increases to 11.7%. Compared to the general population, this risk of ASD is 16 times higher.

Currently, there are two proposed epigenetic mechanisms for VPA increasing the risk in ASD: alteration in folate metabolism and HDAC inhibition. VPA is a weak HDAC inhibitor. The VPA model discerns the potential pathogenesis and mechanisms of action of ASD in animal models. HDAC inhibition is the most understood. In animal models, mice prenatally exposed to VPA had transient hyperacetylation of histones H3 and H4, decreased HDACs, and developed ASD-like symptoms. However, mice prenatally exposed to valpromide, analogous to VPA but not an HDAC inhibitor, did not experience transient hyperacetylation of histones H3 and H4 and did not develop ASD-like symptoms. An important thing to note is the time of VPA. In the animal models, the significant effects of VPA in causing ASD-like symptoms was demonstrated mainly in rats exposed to VPA on gestation day 12.5, not in other gestation days like day 9, 14.5, etc. The ASD-like symptoms of mice included decreased distressed pup calls, decreased social exploration, decreased social behaviors, increased stereotypic locomotion, decreased acoustic prepulse inhibition, and increased sensitivity to non-painful stimuli.

This same association was replicated in the longitudinal studies. Children prenatally exposed to VPA or with fetal valproate syndrome (FVS) have a higher prevalence of ASD. FVS is a rare condition in children that happens due to VPA exposure during the first trimester of pregnancy.

Romidepsin and MS-275, both HDAC inhibitors, improve social preference, which is the preference of social stimuli over non social stimuli,  and interaction times of SHANK 3 deficient mice. Trichostatin A (TSA) is another example of an HDAC inhibitor. It results in increased histone acetylation at the oxytocin and vasopressin receptors of the nucleus accumbens (NA) in female voles, increasing pair bonding. In a small clinical trial, beta hydroxybutyrate, a product of the ketogenic diet and inhibitor of class 1 HDACs, has shown promise in improving the social behavior and skills in children with ASD.'The inhibition of HDAC is correlated with overexpression of other genes. Treatment of mice with valproate also increases hippocampal histone H3 acetylation.

Current candidate genes relating to ASD in mice exposed to valproate in utero are NRXN1, NRXN2, NRXN3, NLGN1, NLGN2, and NLGN3. In the somatosensory cortex, CA1, dentate gyrus, and hippocampus, NLGN3 is significantly downregulated in mice treated with valproate. While this evidence of NLGN3 downregulation due to valproate suggests a potential relevant mechanism for ASD, further research is needed.

Genes Linked to ASD and Other Disorders

Phelan-McDermid Syndrome, Schizophrenia, and ASD 
SHANK proteins are scaffolding proteins at glutamatergic synapses crucial for synaptic development. The disruption of SHANK genes is associated with neurocognitive impairments and disorders. The disruptions, either from mutations or deletions, are associated with disorders such as Phelan-McDermid syndrome (PMS), schizophrenia, and ASD. SHANK 3 is the most studied gene from the SHANK gene family. Several studies have found that disruptions to SHANK 3 cause more severe cognitive impairments than disruptions to SHANK 1 or 2. These findings suggest that the SHANK gene that is disrupted may determine the severity of the cognitive impairments.

A study on two mutant mice lines, one line with an ASD-linked SHANK 3 mutation on exon 21 and the other with a schizophrenia-linked SHANK 3 mutation on exon 21, found differences in the synaptic and behavioral impairments caused by disruptions to SHANK 3. The ASD-linked mutation results in a complete loss of SHANK 3 (like a deletion) and impaired striatal synaptic transmission. The schizophrenia-linked mutation results in a truncated SHANK 3 protein and severe synaptic impairments in the prefrontal cortex.

Other studies suggest that SHANK3 knockout mice display behavioral phenotypes of ASD. These mice display self-injurious grooming, anxiety, and social deficits. Restoration of SHANK 3 in adult mice improved social deficits and self-grooming behaviors. These findings indicate the potential therapeutic effect of restoring SHANK 3. SHANK 3 restoration may alleviate some symptoms of ASD. In addition, modulators and proteins associated with SHANK 3 are potential therapeutic targets for ASD. However, the effects of targeting modulators differ depending on the specific SHANK 3 disruption. For instance, studies have shown that increasing mGluR5 activity improved self grooming and behavioral deficits. Yet, other studies have shown the opposite effect. This demonstrates that the therapeutic effects are dependent on specific SHANK 3 mutation.

ASD and the X Chromosome

There is a definite gender bias in the distribution of ASD.  There are about four times as many affected males across the ASD population.  Even when patients with mutations in X-linked genes (MECP2 and FMR1) are excluded, the gender bias remains.  However, when only looking at patients with the most severe cognitive impairment, the gender bias is not as extreme.  While the most obvious conclusion is that an X-linked gene of major effect is involved in contributing to ASD, the mechanism appears to be much more complex and perhaps epigenetic in origin.

Based on the results of a study on females with Turner syndrome, a hypothesis involving epigenetic mechanisms was proposed to help describe the gender bias of ASD.  Turner syndrome patients have only one X chromosome which can be either maternal or paternal in origin.  When 80 females with monosomy X were tested for measures of social cognition, the patients with a paternally derived X chromosome performed better than those with a maternally derived X chromosome.  Males have only one X chromosome, derived from their mother.  If a gene on the paternal X chromosome confers improved social skills, males are deficient in the gene.  This could explain why males are more likely to be diagnosed with ASD.

In the proposed model, the candidate gene is silenced on the maternal copy of the X chromosome.  Thus, males do not express this gene and are more susceptible to subsequent impairments in social and communication skills.  Females, on the other hand, are more resistant to ASD. Recently a cluster of imprinted genes on the mouse X chromosome was discovered; the paternal allele was expressed while the female copy was imprinted and silenced. Further studies are aimed at discovering whether these genes contribute directly to behavior and whether the counterpart genes in humans are imprinted.

The Link to Rett Syndrome
Epigenetic alterations of the methylation states of genes such as MECP2 and EGR2 have been shown to play a role in autism and autism spectrum disorders.  MECP2 abnormalities have been shown to lead to a wide range of phenotypic variability and molecular complexities.  These variabilities have led to the exploration of the clinical and molecular convergence between Rett syndrome and autism.

Sleeping and language impairments, seizures, and developmental timing are common in both autism and Rett syndrome (RTT).  Because of these phenotypic similarities, there has been research into the specific genetic similarities between these two pervasive developmental disorders.  MECP2 has been identified as the predominant gene involved in RTT. It has also been shown that the regulation of the MECP2 gene expression has been implicated in autism.  Rett syndrome brain samples and autism brain samples show immaturity of dendrite spines and reduction of cell-body size due to errors in coupled regulation between MECP2 and EGR2.   However, because of the multigene involvement in autism, the MECP2 gene has only been identified as a vulnerability factor in autism.  The most current model illustrating MECP2 is known as the transcriptional activator model.

Another potential molecular convergence involves the early growth response gene-2 (EGR2).  EGR2 is the only gene in the EGR family that is restricted to the central nervous system and is involved in cerebral development and synaptic plasticity.  EGR2 expression has been shown to decrease in the cortexes of individuals with both autism and RTT.  MECP2 expression has also been shown to decrease in individuals with RTT and autism.  MECP2 and EGR2  have been shown to regulate each other during neuronal maturation. A role for the dysregulation of the activity-dependent EGR2/MECP2 pathway in RTT and autism has been proposed. Further molecular linkages are being examined; however, the exploration of MECP2 and EGR2 have provided a common link between RTT, autism, and similarities in phenotypic expression.

Potential applications of epigenetic research to treatment of ASD 

Folate pathways have been studied to be potential predictors of ASD. A few genetic polymorphisms such as folate hydrolase 1 and hydroxymethyltransferase 1 along with hyperhomocysteinemia were used as risk factors to develop an artificial neural network (ANN). Studies showed that this model was around 63.8% accurate in predicting ASD risk, implying a moderate association between genetic polymorphisms of the folate pathway and autism risk.
*8*

The most important methyl donor for DNA methylation is 5-methyl-tetrahydrofolate. Consequently, any changes in folate levels or folate metabolism could significantly impact DNA methylation and contribute to what causes autism. This idea is what makes folate pathways a potential predictor of ASD because genetic polymorphisms of the folate pathway could have different effects on DNA methylation. In general, lower folate levels in pregnant women have been associated with increased ASD risk. The effect of enhancing folate levels on the symptoms of ASD are still being researched and have yet to be confirmed.

References

Further reading
 
 
 
 
  
 
 
 
 
 

Epigenetics
Genetics of autism